Ironi Modi'in is an Israeli football club based in Modi'in-Maccabim-Re'ut. The club is currently in Liga Aleph South division.

History
The club was founded in 2009 and played their first ever match on 11 September 2009, in which they won 5–1 against fellow Liga Gimel club, Maccabi Segev Shalom, at the second round of the 2009–10 Israel State Cup.

In 2011–12, their third season of existence, Modi'in won Liga Gimel Central division and were promoted to Liga Bet. In that season, the club also achieved a record victory, 21–0 against Hapoel Ramla.

Modi'in finished their debut season in Liga Bet at the seventh place of South B division. In the following season, they finished fourth and qualified for the promotion play-offs, where they beat Beitar Giv'at Ze'ev 1–0 in the first round. However, in the second round, they lost 0–1 to Hapoel Rahat and remained in Liga Bet.

The club's best placing to date came at the 2014–15 season, when they finished runners-up, one point behind the league winners, Bnei Eilat, and qualified for the promotion play-offs, where they beat Hapoel Merhavim 1–0 and Beitar Ma'ale Adumim 2–1 after extra time, and advanced to the regional final, where they lost 3–5 on penalties to Hapoel Kiryat Ono, after a goalless draw.

Honours
Liga Gimel Central:
2011–12

Notable managers

 Eli Cohen (born 1951)

External links
Ironi Modi'in The Israel Football Association

References

Modi'in
Association football clubs established in 2009
2009 establishments in Israel